Fred Stamps (born December 10, 1980) is a retired football  slotback  in the Canadian Football League who last played for the Montreal Alouettes. But signed a 1 day contract to officially retire as part of the Edmonton Eskimos. He was originally signed by the San Francisco 49ers as an undrafted free agent in 2004. He played college football at UL Lafayette. Stamps has also been a member of the Jacksonville Jaguars, Baltimore Ravens, Edmonton Eskimos, and Montreal Alouettes.

College career
Fred Stamps played for the Louisiana–Lafayette Ragin' Cajuns from 2000 till 2003. Stamps also played track and field and baseball.

Professional career

National Football League
In 2004, Stamps was signed by the San Francisco 49ers as an undrafted free agent. Following his release by the 49ers, Stamps spent time on the practice squads for both the Baltimore Ravens and the Jacksonville Jaguars.

Edmonton Eskimos
Fred Stamps decided to sign with the Edmonton Eskimos of the Canadian Football League. In the 2007 CFL season Stamps played in nine games (he missed five games because of appendectomy surgery). The following year Fred Stamps played in 14 games amassing 751 receiving yards and 6 touchdowns. In the 2009 CFL season played all 18 games and recorded 1,402 yards and 8 touchdowns. In 2010 Stamps once again suffered an injury this time injuring his shoulder. He missed 4 games but still had a great year statistically, collecting 1,223 yards and 5 touchdowns. Stamps added a third consecutive 1,000 yard season in the 2011 campaign, amassing 1,153 yards and 8 touchdowns on 82 receptions; despite missing a couple of weeks because of a serious injury to his testicles. In the off-season the Eskimos traded away franchise QB Ricky Ray. Stamps played in all 18 games of the regular season and finished 2nd in receiving yards with 1,310 and 4th in receiving TDs with 9. Stamps lead the league in receiving yards in the 2013 season with 1,259 yards.

Montreal Alouettes
Stamps was traded to the Montreal Alouettes in exchange for Kenny Stafford on January 16, 2015. Fred Stamps was released from the Alouettes on January 25, 2016.

Retirement
After spending three years as a free agent Fred signed a 1 day contract to officially retire as an Edmonton Eskimo

Statistics

References

External links
Montreal Alouettes bio
Edmonton Eskimos bio

1980 births
Living people
African-American players of Canadian football
American football wide receivers
American players of Canadian football
Baltimore Ravens players
Canadian football wide receivers
Edmonton Elks players
Jacksonville Jaguars players
Louisiana Ragin' Cajuns football players
Montreal Alouettes players
Players of American football from New Orleans
Players of Canadian football from New Orleans
San Francisco 49ers players
21st-century African-American sportspeople
20th-century African-American people